The Drug Knot is a 1986 CBS Schoolbreak Special, a cautionary tale about teenage drug dependency.

Plot
High-school student Doug Dawson has it all: a loving family (composed of his younger brother and their parents), a terrific girlfriend, a rock band he plays in after school...and a drug habit. He began by smoking marijuana but is now seeking more dangerous highs. The latter costs him everything else, as his behavior becomes increasingly erratic and alienation – some of it mutual – sets in. Doug wanders into an anti-drug lecture by David Toma, playing himself, but Doug is eventually ejected for disruptive behavior. In his bedroom, Doug snorts a line of cocaine, unaware his younger brother is watching from the doorway.

Doug's girlfriend tires of his volatile behavior and she convinces Doug's mother to meet with the charismatic Toma to get help for Doug. Initially in denial, Mrs. Dawson agrees to seek help for her son. However, unlike most young people's specials, The Drug Knot has a completely downbeat ending. Doug's adoring younger brother Louie finds his brother's drug supply and snorts a line himself. Doug arrives home to find Louie floating face down in the family swimming pool. As Doug frantically jumps into the pool to rescue Louie, a voiceover of Toma asks: "You kids are killing yourselves...for what?"

Cast
 Dermot Mulroney as Doug Dawson
 David Toma as Himself
 Mary Ellen Trainor as Helen Dawson
 Lawrence Pressman as Jack Dawson
 David Faustino as Louie Dawson
 Rance Howard as Mr. Sellers
 Nick Angotti as Coach
 Tracy Nelson as Lori
 Kim Myers as Kim
 Annie Oringer as Annie
 Duane Boutte as Leon
 Barbara Stamm as Mary Parks

External links

1986 television films
1986 films
American television films
Films about drugs
Films directed by Anson Williams